The Gunhild Cross, named for its first owner, Gunhild, a daughter of Svend III of Denmark, is a mid-12th-century crucifix carved in walrus tusk and with both Latin and Runic inscriptions. It is now in the collection of the National Museum of Denmark.

History
It is believed that the cross was created around 1150. A Latin inscription reads "Liutgerus who carved me at the behest of Helena, who is also called Gunnhildr". Based on research by Harald Langberg, it is believed that King Svend refers to Svend III Grathe, (died 1157) and not as previously believed Sweyn II Estridsen. The artist Luitger is not known from other works. 

The cross is first mentioned in 1650 and had at that time supposedly belonged to ' wife . In 1684, it was acquired by the Royal Cabinet of Curiosities (Kunstkammer). In 1945, it was transferred to the National Museum of Denmark.

Description

The cross is carved in two blocks of walrus tusk and measures . It was originally painted in red, blue and golden colours.

The central Christ figure on the front side is missing. The four cross arms is decorated with carved medallions of female figures, symbolizing "Life" (top), "Death" (bottom), the "victorious church" (left) and the "defeated synagogue" (right). The rear side of the cross is also decorated with carvings. In the centre is a Last Judgement representation of Christ in Majesty. The four medallions depict scenes from Heaven (top) and Hell (bottom) as well as the saved (left) and damned souls (right). 

The Latin inscriptions are written carved in relatively wide capital letters with an abundant use of ligatures and abbreviations. The name Gunhild is also written in runes on the edge of the bottom medallion. The Latin inscription reads:

See also
Dagmar Cross

References

External links

Medieval European objects in the National Museum of Denmark
Crucifixes
Ivory works of art
Runic inscriptions
12th-century sculptures